Adolf Reich (15 November 1901 – 1944) was a Czech hurdler. He competed for Czechoslovakia in the men's 110 metres hurdles at the 1920 Summer Olympics.

References

External links
 
 

1901 births
1944 deaths
Athletes (track and field) at the 1920 Summer Olympics
Czech male hurdlers
Olympic athletes of Czechoslovakia
Place of birth missing